The South Yorkshire Passenger Transport Executive is the passenger transport executive for South Yorkshire in England. It is supervised by the South Yorkshire Mayoral Combined Authority, which consists of representatives from the metropolitan boroughs of Sheffield, Rotherham, Doncaster, and Barnsley.

History 
Between 1974 and 1994 it ran virtually all bus services in the county. From 1986 until 1993, buses were operated by an arms length company, South Yorkshire Transport, until a management buyout created the bus operating company Mainline Group. Shortly after Stagecoach purchased a 20% stake in the company, however this was sold in 1995 to FirstBus.

Operations 
SYPTE is responsible for all the bus stops, shelters and bus interchanges in the county, along with park & ride sites. It provides comprehensive public transport information at stops, in the form of timetable leaflets, information on the web and a telephone enquiry service called Traveline.

SYPTE has a network of Information Centres providing information and ticketing. SYPTE administers the concessionary travel schemes for children and students, senior citizens and the mobility impaired and the countywide multi-modal ticket Travelmaster.

It is responsible for various public transport services in the county, particularly the Sheffield Supertram and various subsidised bus services.

Travel South Yorkshire

The South Yorkshire public transport network, of which SYPTE is a key deliverer of passenger services, was re-branded as Travel South Yorkshire in 2006. Changes include the introduction of the YourNextBus scheme on all stops as well as LED departure boards on the town's most often run routes at certain stops.

Timetable information
Travel South Yorkshire provides timetable information for all bus and train services within South Yorkshire. Some leaflets are available from Interchanges.

Travel interchanges

Travel South Yorkshire's interchanges at Sheffield, Arundel Gate in Sheffield, Rotherham, Barnsley, Doncaster, Hillsborough and Dinnington provide information and advice about public transport in South Yorkshire. From these interchanges, information can be obtained and a range of multi-modal (TravelMaster) tickets can be bought from self-serve vending machines. Other travel passes which were previously available at 'Information Centre' desks at these interchanges are now only available from the Travel South Yorkshire website or over the phone from Traveline.

Multi-modal ticketing
Travel South Yorkshire sells a range of multi-modal tickets on behalf of the public transport operators of South Yorkshire. These are generally in the form of smart card tickets and are commercial products which do not receive a subsidy.

Bus

Bus interchanges 
Travel South Yorkshire operate thirteen bus interchanges, many of which have been newly built or refurbished in the early 2000s. These bus interchanges provide a hub for local, regional and sometimes national bus and coach services, and in some locations also provide an interchange facility onto light rail and heavy rail services.

Adwick Interchange  
Arundel Gate Interchange  ( Castle Square, 150m)
Barnsley Interchange  
Crystal Peaks bus station  
Dinnington Interchange 
Doncaster Frenchgate Interchange  
Grimethorpe Interchange 
Hillsborough Interchange  
Manor Top Interchange  
Meadowhall Interchange   
Mexborough Interchange  (300m)
Rotherham Interchange  (200m)
Sheffield Interchange  (150m)

Trolleybus 

In 1985, the SYPTE purchased an Alexander RH bodied Dennis Dominator trolleybus with a view to reintroducing a trolleybus network. A one mile section on Sandall Beat Road alongside Doncaster Racecourse was wired. However with deregulation in 1986, the project was shelved.

Rail

Routes 
Stations in italics are located outside of the South Yorkshire PTE area.

Notes:
 – Station is located in West Yorkshire, but SYPTE multi-modal TravelMaster tickets are valid to and from these railway stations.

Opened and re-opened stations 
Eleven new stations were opened by SYPTE between 1983 and 1993. Many of these were re-opened former stations previously closed in the 1960s under the Beeching cuts, but not all; Goldthorpe and Thurnscoe were entirely new stations, Rotherham Central was built to replace the closing  which was further away from Rotherham town centre, and Meadowhall Interchange was built to serve the new Meadowhall Shopping Centre. Rotherham Parkgate, the terminus of the Sheffield Supertram tram-train pilot scheme from Sheffield city centre, opened in October 2018.

1983 – 
1984 –  (station re-sited) 
1987 – 
1988 – ; 
1989 – 
1990 – Meadowhall Interchange; Swinton
1991 – 
1992 – Bentley
1993 – 
2018 – Rotherham Parkgate

Awards

National Transport Awards 

 Integrated Transport Authority of the Year (2013).
 Technology Award for the GetThereSooner project.
 Rail Station of the Year.
 Joe Clarke Passenger Transport Authority of the Year.

Institution of Highways and Transportation Awards 

 IHT/Mouchel Parkman Accessibility Award for Sheffield Station.

Yorkshire Renaissance Awards 

 Rail Project Award for Sheffield Station.

UK Bus Awards 

 Local Authority Bus Project of the Year Award for Sheffield Bus Partnership (2013).
 Making Buses a Better Choice Award for Sheffield Bus Partnership (2013).

Secure Stations Scheme 

 Crime Prevention charity Crime Concern’s Award for Meadowhall Interchange, Swinton and Adwick.
TravelWise Awards
 Best Travel Awareness Event Award for Carbon Quids campaign.
Institution of Civil Engineers’ Yorkshire & Humber Awards
 Award for Excellence for Barnsley Interchange.
Light Rail Awards
 Project of the Year Award for the £3m Supertram revamp.
Rail Business Awards
 Station Excellence Award for Rotherham Central station.
Local Government Chronicle (LGC) Awards
 Most Innovative Service Delivery Model Award for Sheffield Bus Partnership.

References

External links

South Yorkshire Passenger Transport Executive
Travel South Yorkshire Public transport information for South Yorkshire
South Yorkshire Passenger Transport Authority
Passenger Transport Executive Group

Companies owned by municipalities of England
Public transport executives in the United Kingdom
Transport in South Yorkshire
1974 establishments in England